Verdal may refer to:

Places
Verdal, a municipality in Trøndelag county, Norway
Verdal Station, a railway station located in the town of Verdalsøra in the municipality of Verdal in Trøndelag county, Norway

People
 Sigurd Verdal (1927–2010), a Norwegian politician

Grapes
Verdal noir or Aspiran noir, a red French wine grape variety
Verdal or Forcallat tinta, a red Spanish wine grape variety
Verdal or Malvasia di Sardegna, a group of wine grape varieties grown historically in the Mediterranean region
Verdal or Palomino (grape), a white grape widely grown in Spain and South Africa
Verdal or Verdejo, a variety of wine grape that has long been grown in the Rueda region of Spain

Other
Verdal IL, a sports club from Verdalsøra, Norway

See also
Verdalle, a commune in the Tarn department in southern France